Teruo Murakami is a former international table tennis player from Japan.

Table tennis career
From 1959 to 1961 he won several medals in singles, doubles, and team events in the World Table Tennis Championships and in the Asian Table Tennis Championships.

His four World Championship medals included two gold medals in the doubles with Ichiro Ogimura at the 1959 World Table Tennis Championships and team event at the 1959 World Table Tennis Championships.

He also won two English Open titles.

See also
 List of table tennis players
 List of World Table Tennis Championships medalists

References

Japanese male table tennis players